Set Mo  are an Australian electronic music duo made up of disc jockeys and music producers Nick Drabble and Stu Turner. The duo are from Sydney.

Background
Drabble and Turner began to form an interest in EDM at the age of 18. They met at several parties and started a joint project. The pair gained widespread recognition through their song White Dress, which was released in collaboration with Warner Music and placed 42nd on the Australian Club Charts of 2015. Their song "Unity" peaked at #6 in industry magazine Resident Advisor's chart in April 2018. The duo have appeared at many festivals nationwide including: Field Day, Falls Festival, Splendour in the Grass and Beyond The Valley, among others. Most of their songs were produced in Australia, London, Amsterdam and Berlin.

Discography

Albums

EPs

Singles

References

Australian electronic musicians
Australian house musicians
Australian house music groups